A gay day or gay night is a scheduled time at an establishment dedicated to attracting and catering to the gay community.

Bars
In many communities there are no gay bars or gay community centers and therefore there are no facilities dedicated to or allowing for socializing amongst the LGBT community. The most common form of a gay establishment is a gay bar and in areas without any this is the most common form of non-gay establishment to create a time and a place for gay men and lesbians to congregate outside of private parties or trips to isolated gay pride events. These bars hold a gay night that markets to gay people to dance, drink and meet one another. This is in addition to their friends and supporters also known as the PFLAG community or straight allies in general.

Gay days
In other cases theme parks or movie theaters will host a gay day or gay days. With the case of theme parks it is often unofficial and simply organized by the visitors themselves or a committee that creates a group to approach a park or other amenity on a specified day. The artistic community is generally more open about its acceptance of the gay community.

Theme parks
Moreover the theme parks tend to be apprehensive to being viewed as openly supportive because they attract a lot of families and conservative people that may be uncomfortable or unaccepting of homosexuals. In the past places such as Disneyland would remove people wearing items identifying them as gay on Disneyland gay days such as a gay day shirt or a particular color used in later years to prevent a public backlash from those disapproving of the lesbian and gay patrons. However as attitudes have changed regarding the community this has changed to a tacit endorsement of the pink dollar with a more passive acceptance with such parks often stating they simply cannot prevent people from coming into the park based on arbitrary distinguishing demographics and that they do not endorse any privately organized group events at their parks.

See also

 Gay Days at Walt Disney World
 List of LGBT events

Gay events
Bartending